Javier Jiménez (born 10 March 1948) is a Mexican former swimmer. He competed in the men's 100 metre breaststroke at the 1968 Summer Olympics.

References

External links
 

1948 births
Living people
Olympic swimmers of Mexico
Swimmers at the 1968 Summer Olympics
Swimmers from Mexico City
Mexican male breaststroke swimmers